KELB-LP is a Southern Gospel and Contemporary Christian formatted broadcast radio station licensed to and serving Lake Charles, Louisiana.  KELB-LP is owned and operated by Five Point Radio, Inc.

References

External links
 KELB-LP Online
 

2004 establishments in Louisiana
Contemporary Christian radio stations in the United States
Southern Gospel radio stations in the United States
Radio stations established in 2004
Low-power FM radio stations in Louisiana
ELB-LP
Christian radio stations in Louisiana